Moriya (written: 森谷 or 守屋) is a Japanese surname. Notable people with the surname include:

, Japanese idol and model
Azuma Moriya (1884 – 1975), Japanese educator
, Japanese volleyball player
, Japanese tennis player
, Japanese footballer
, Japanese archer

Japanese-language surnames